This article features the 1994 UEFA European Under-18 Championship qualifying stage. Matches were played 1993 through 1994. Two qualifying rounds were organised and seven teams qualified for the main tournament, joining host Spain.

Round 1

Group 1

Group 2
All matches were played in Wales.

Group 3
All matches were played in Northern Ireland.

Group 4
All matches were played in Malta.

Group 5

|}
 withdrew.

Group 6
All matches were played in Israel.

Group 7
All matches were played in Switzerland.

Group 8

Group 9

Group 10

Group 11
All matches were played in Sweden.

Group 12

Group 13

Group 14

|}

Round 2

|}

See also
 1994 UEFA European Under-18 Championship

External links
Results by RSSSF

UEFA European Under-19 Championship qualification
Qual